Streptomyces naganishii is a bacterium species from the genus of Streptomyces which has been isolated from soil in Japan.

See also 
 List of Streptomyces species

References

Further reading

External links
Type strain of Streptomyces naganishii at BacDive -  the Bacterial Diversity Metadatabase	

naganishii
Bacteria described in 1955